Warner Robins Train Depot is a historic train depot in Warner Robins, Georgia in Houston County, Georgia. It was added to the National Register of Historic Places on January 2, 2008. It is located at 99 North Armed Forces Blvd., across the street from the main gate of Robins Air Force Base.

It was built during 1943-44 as a combined passenger and freight depot.  It is a one-story brick building.  It was designed with separate waiting areas for white passengers vs. African-American passengers.  In 2007 (and still in 2017) it served as the E.L. Greenway Welcome Center for Warner Robins and the Warner Robins Convention and Visitors' Bureau, and it has a caboose, Mildred's Country Store, the Elberta Depot Heritage Center, and World War II Museum.

See also
National Register of Historic Places listings in Houston County, Georgia

References

External links

Buildings and structures in Houston County, Georgia
Railway stations on the National Register of Historic Places in Georgia (U.S. state)
Warner Robins, Georgia
Former railway stations in Georgia (U.S. state)